Parkin coregulated gene protein is a protein that in humans is encoded by the PACRG gene.

This gene encodes a protein that is conserved across metazoans. In vertebrates, this gene is linked in a head-to-head arrangement with the adjacent parkin gene, which is associated with autosomal recessive juvenile Parkinson's disease. These genes are co-regulated in various tissues and they share a bi-directional promoter. Both genes are associated with susceptibility to leprosy. The parkin co-regulated gene protein forms a large molecular complex with chaperones, including heat shock proteins 70 and 90, and chaperonin components. This protein is also a component of Lewy bodies in Parkinson's disease patients, and it suppresses unfolded Pael receptor-induced neuronal cell death. Multiple transcript variants encoding different isoforms have been found for this gene.

References

Further reading